Francisco Carlos  (born 26 April 1963), known as Chiquinho Carlos, is a Brazilian retired footballer who played as a forward.

He spent 11 years of his professional career in Portugal (21 in total in the country), amassing Primeira Liga totals of 271 matches and 70 goals over nine seasons and representing mainly Benfica, Vitória de Guimarães and Braga.

Club career
Born in Taquaritinga, São Paulo, Chiquinho Carlos started playing with Botafogo Futebol Clube (SP) and Clube de Regatas do Flamengo. In 1986, he moved to Portugal where he would remain for the rest of his career, representing S.L. Benfica, Vitória de Guimarães, S.C. Braga, Vitória de Setúbal, Académico de Viseu F.C. and Atlético Clube de Portugal.
 
Chiquinho scored in his first official game for Benfica, a 2–2 away draw against FC Porto on 24 August 1986. He won the double in his first season, going on to take part in 80 competitive matches during his two-year spell and score 21 goals. Additionally, he appeared with the side in the 1987–88 European Cup, playing the full 120 minutes in the final, a penalty shootout loss to PSV Eindhoven.

From ages 35 to 44, Chiquinho Carlos played amateur football with C.D. Mafra and G.D. Igreja Nova. He returned to the former immediately after retiring, acting as goalkeeper coach for several years.

Honours
Benfica
Primeira Liga: 1986–87
Taça de Portugal: 1986–87
Supertaça Cândido de Oliveira runner-up: 1986, 1987

Vitória Guimarães
Supertaça Cândido de Oliveira: 1988

References

External links

1963 births
Living people
Footballers from São Paulo (state)
Brazilian footballers
Association football forwards
Campeonato Brasileiro Série A players
Botafogo Futebol Clube (SP) players
CR Flamengo footballers
Primeira Liga players
Liga Portugal 2 players
Segunda Divisão players
S.L. Benfica footballers
Vitória S.C. players
S.C. Braga players
Vitória F.C. players
Académico de Viseu F.C. players
Atlético Clube de Portugal players
C.D. Mafra players
Brazilian expatriate footballers
Expatriate footballers in Portugal
Brazilian expatriate sportspeople in Portugal
People from Taquaritinga